Samuel Labarthe (born 16 May 1962) is a French-Swiss actor. He appeared in more than fifty films since 1985.

Selected filmography

References

External links 

1962 births
Living people
French male film actors